Hùng Sơn is a township (thị trấn) and capital of Đại Từ District, Thái Nguyên Province, in northeastern Vietnam.

References

Populated places in Thái Nguyên province
Townships in Vietnam
District capitals in Vietnam